Edward John Ryan  (19 August 1902 – 29 December 1975) was an Australian rules footballer who played with Fitzroy in the Victorian Football League (VFL).

Notes

External links 
		

1902 births
Australian rules footballers from Victoria (Australia)
Fitzroy Football Club players
Sale Football Club players
1975 deaths